Sherrybaby is a 2006 American drama film written and directed by Laurie Collyer. Screened at the Sundance Film Festival on January 25, 2006, the film received a limited release in the United States on September 8, 2006.

Plot
The story takes place in New Jersey. Sherry Swanson (Maggie Gyllenhaal), a young woman who has recently been released from prison and is recovering from a heroin addiction, is trying to rebuild her life on the outside. Above all, she wants to repair her relationship with her young daughter, but finds the challenges more daunting than she had expected.  Her daughter barely recognizes her and no longer calls her "mommy", the halfway house where she lives has a curfew that interferes with her ability to visit her family, and her relationship with her family has become tense and strained and she often tends to act childlike at times.

In between trips to visit her daughter and her job at a youth center, Sherry attends Alcoholics Anonymous meetings in an effort to beat back her addiction to heroin.  She strikes up a relationship with Dean (Danny Trejo), a fellow addict she meets at Alcoholics Anonymous. The stresses of her damaged relationships with her family, satisfying her parole officer, and finding a way to reconnect with her daughter soon prove overwhelming.  Sherry soon starts drinking and using drugs again, putting her parole at risk.  Struggling to maintain a grip on her life, Sherry finally breaks down and admits to her brother that she knows she needs help.

Cast

 Maggie Gyllenhaal as Sherry Swanson
 Brad William Henke as Bobby Swanson
 Sam Bottoms as Bob Swanson, Sr.
 Kate Burton as Marcia Swanson
 Giancarlo Esposito as parole officer Hernandez
 Rio Hackford as Andy Kelly
 Danny Trejo as Dean Walker
 Michelle Hurst as Dorothy Washington
 Caroline Clay as parole officer Murphy
 Bridget Barkan as Lynette Swanson
 Ryan Simpkins as Alexis Parks
 Stephen Peabody as Mr. Monroe

Reception
Sherrybaby received generally positive reviews from critics. Review aggregator Rotten Tomatoes reports that 75% of 67 critics gave the film a positive review. The site's consensus is that "Maggie Gyllenhaal delivers [a] riveting performance as a recovering drug addict in a depressing and entirely believable movie." Metacritic, which assigns a rating out of 100 to reviews from mainstream critics, calculated a "generally favorable" average score of 66, based on 18 reviews. Entertainment Weekly praised the film as "emotionally arresting" and "authentic and moving", and describes Gyllenhaal as "such a miracle of an actress that she makes you respond to the innocence of Sherry's desperate, selfish destruction." The Christian Science Monitor also gave a positive review of the film, complimenting Collyer's "vivid eye for detail and the small, telling human moments that make a movie resonate with audiences".

Awards and nominations

References

External links
 
 
 
 
 

2006 films
2006 drama films
American drama films
Crystal Globe winners
Films about drugs
Films set in New Jersey
Films shot in New Jersey
Big Beach (company) films
American independent films
2006 independent films
Films about mother–daughter relationships
2000s English-language films
2000s American films
English-language drama films